Syed Anwar Hossain (5 November 1947) is a Bangladeshi academic and historian. He is a former Director General of Bangla Academy. He is the President of Bangladesh Itihas Samiti.

Early life and education 
Hossain was born on 5 November 1947 to a Bengali Muslim family of Syeds from the Bogra District in Rajshahi Division, Dominion of Pakistan. He has a Bachelors and Masters from the University of Dhaka. He also has a Masters in International History from the University of Edinburgh. He completed his PhD from University of London in British Administrative History. He studied at the University of California, Berkeley on a Fulbright scholarship.

Career 
Hossain joined the University of Dhaka in 1970 as a lecturer in the Department of History. He was promoted to professor in 1985. From 1993 to 1996, he served as the chairperson of the Department of History at the University of Dhaka. He was the Director General of Bangla Academy from 1997 to 2001.

From 2004 to 2005, he worked as the Vice-Chancellor of Darul Ihsan University. He was a visiting professor at the American University, Columbia University, and University of Pennsylvania. He retired from the University of Dhaka in 2014 and was appointed the Supernumerary Professor there. He was awarded the Ekushey Padak in 2009.

From 2010 to 2012, he was the founder editor of Daily Sun. He is the Bangabandhu Chair at the Bangladesh University of Professionals.

References 

Living people
University of Dhaka alumni
Academic staff of the University of Dhaka
Alumni of the University of Edinburgh
Alumni of the University of London
Recipients of the Ekushey Padak
20th-century Bangladeshi historians
1947 births
21st-century Bangladeshi historians
People from Bogra District
Bangladeshi people of Arab descent